Domanove is a village in Kovel Raion, Rivne Oblast, Ukraine.

Geography
Situated in the northwest corner of Ukraine, Domanove is located on Ukraine's border with Belarus. The Domanove border checkpoint is just north of the village; the Belarusian town of Mokrany is directly across the border. It lies on European route E85, which connects it to the regional capital of Lutsk, 148 kilometers to the southwest. Domanove is 23 kilometers from Ratne, the nearest sizable town. 

In the interwar period, the village was a part of the Volhynian Voivodeship of the Second Polish Republic.

Climate
The village experiences a humid continental climate.

Demographics
The 1989 census of the Ukrainian Soviet Socialist Republic reported a population of 293 in the village. By the Ukrainian census of 2001, the population fell to 289.

Language
According to the 2001 census, 98.96% of residents spoke Ukrainian as their first language, 0.69% spoke Russian, and 0.35% spoke Belarusian.

Gallery

See also
Domanove (border checkpoint)
Kovel Raion
Ratne

References

Villages in Kovel Raion